Liposcelis bostrychophila is a species of booklouse in the family Liposcelididae. It is known nearly worldwide as a common pest of stored products. It is especially prevalent in cereals. In 2019 it was identified as a predator of mosquito eggs in a FAO/IAEA Insect Pest Control Laboratory which developed sterile males.

This insect is about a millimetre long, brown in color, and wingless. Females of this species often undergo parthenogenesis and populations consist almost entirely of females. A male specimen was not noted until 2002 and a few years later, another sexually-reproducing strain was found.

Description 
Like other liposcelids it has short antennae with 15 segments, reduced eyes, and a flattened body with a relatively long abdomen. The femur of the hind leg is wide and flattened, the tarsi have three segments and the coxae are widely separated from each other.

Distribution 
Liposcelis bostrychophila has a world-wide distribution, being found in grain stores, warehouses, factories and households, wherever dry foodstuffs are processed or stored.

Reproduction and development 
In most populations of Liposcelis bostrychophila, only females are present and reproduction is by parthenogenesis. During her lifetime, the female produces about 200 eggs. These hatch into nymphs which resemble the adult form and pass through four moults before maturing at about 40 days. In 2002, a sexually reproducing strain of L. bostrychophila with both sexes was found in Hawaii, and in 2009, another was found in Arizona. In both of these, reproduction was by sexual means and parthenogenesis did not occur. An endosymbiotic bacterium, Rickettsia sp., is present in all the asexually-reproducing individuals tested, but is absent from the sexually-reproducing strains; this suggests the possibility that the Rickettsia actually causes parthenogenesis, although this remains to be demonstrated. Rickettsia has been implicated in this way in the case of two parthenogenetically-reproducing eulophid wasps.

Liposcelis bostrychophila can pause its development by entering diapause, and can survive for up to two months without food.

Pest status 
Historically, Liposcelis bostrychophila has been considered a minor pest of stored commodities, perhaps because the small size of the insect made them seem insignificant in comparison with more noticeable pests such as the rice weevil (Sitophilus oryzae), the maize weevil (Sitophilus zeamais), and the lesser grain borer (Rhyzopertha dominica). More recently they have emerged as one of the most important stored good pests because of their prolificacy and resistance to chemical control. Traditional pesticides are problematic for use in foodstuffs because of their expense, the toxic residues they may leave, the safety of workers, and the development of resistance by the pests.

Liposcelis bostrychophila was found for the first time as a museum pest in 2010 when specimens in a Kuala Lumpur museum were found to be infested by soft-bodied insects which were later identified as L. bostrychophila. The specimens were medically-important dried insects and naphthalene balls had been used to keep away insect pests. The naphthalene was found to have largely evaporated, allowing entry to the stored goods pest, and subsequent control was difficult. It was identified in 2019 as the predator responsible for damaging stored eggs in a mosquito-rearing facility.

References 

Liposcelis
Cosmopolitan arthropods
Psocoptera of Europe
Insects described in 1931